The Secretary of State for Defence (SEDEF) is the second-highest-ranking official in the Ministry of Defence of Spain. The SEDEF is a civilian which is appointed by the King with the advice of the Defence Minister. In spite of being the second authority of the Ministry, it is behind the Chief of the Defence Staff as far as military control is concerned.

The duties of the SEDEF are related to management and control of the economic resources, the armament policy and the defence infraestructures.

The current Secretary of State for Defence, since May 11, 2022, is Ms. Amparo Valcarce, former Undersecretary of Defence.

Functions
The current functions are regulated by a Royal Decree of 2017, and are the following:

The Secretary of State for Defense is the highest body of the Department responsible for the direction, promotion and management of weapons and material policies, and for the research, development and industrial, economic, infrastructure, environmental and systems, technologies and security of information innovation in the field of Defence.

Apart from these, SEDEF can carry out all those functions delegated to it by the Minister of Defense.

Structure
From the Secretary of State for Defence depends:
 The Directorate-General for Armament and Material (DGAM).
 It is the department responsible for the planning and development of the armament and material policy of the Ministry, as well as the supervision and direction of its execution.
 The Directorate-General for Economic Affairs (DIGENECO).
 It is the governing body responsible for the planning and development of the economic and financial policy of the Ministry, as well as the supervision and direction of its execution.
 The Directorate-General for Infrastructure (DIGENIN).
 It is the body responsible for the planning and development of the infrastructure, environmental and energy policies of the Ministry, as well as the supervision and direction of its execution.
 The Centre for Systems and Technologies of the Information and Communications.
 To which corresponds the planning and development of the policies of the systems, technologies and information security of the Department, as well as the supervision and direction of its execution. For these purposes, the competent bodies in the aforementioned matters of the Armed Forces and the autonomous agencies of the Department depend functionally on this center.
 
The following agencies also depends from the SEDEF:
 The National Institute for Aerospace Technology.
 It is the defense agency in charge of research and technological development in the fields of aeronautics, space, hydrodynamics, security and defense. It is commonly considered as Spain's Space Agency, but Spain has not have a Space Agency.
 The Institute for Housing, Infrastructure and Defense Equipment.
 It is the agency of the Ministry of Defense responsible for administering the assets of the ministry as well as ensuring that all military personnel and their families have a place to live.
 The Military Constructions Service.
 It is a department of the Institute for Housing, Infrastructure and Defense Equipment responsible for the construction of military installations and other constructions of national security interest.

List of Secretaries of State for Defence
Before this office was created, all its duties were carried out by the Undersecretary of Defence.

References

Military of Spain
Military units and formations established in 1984
1984 establishments in Spain
Secretaries of State of Spain
Spain